KMB Jazz is one half of Kordova Milk Bar Records and was founded by Eric Devin in 2006 to sell music in the free jazz genre (sometimes called improvised jazz or avant-garde). Based in Eugene, Oregon, the label came about when Devin heard the work of the New York City collective Eye Contact (Matt Lavelle, Matthew Heyner, Ryan Sawyer).

Discography
 KMB006 Eye Contact – War Rug November 2006
 KMB007 Ras Moshe Quartet – Transcendence March 2007
 KMB010 Joe Morris – Atmosphere April 2009
 KMB012 Matt Lavelle – Cuica in the Third House June 2007
 KMB013 William Hooker/Sabir Mateen – Dharma June 2007
 KMB014 Evil Eye – Doin' It All for My Baby June 2007
 KMB015 Ideal Bread – The Ideal Bread December 2007
 KMB016 Trio Caveat – Compliments of the Season December 2007
 KMB018 Matt Lavelle's Morcilla – The Manifestation March 2009

See also
 List of record labels

References

American record labels
Record labels established in 2006
Jazz record labels